Pia Mariane Sundhage (born 13 February 1960) is a Swedish football manager and former professional player. She is the head coach of the Brazil women's national team. As a player, Sundhage played most of her career as a forward and retired as the top scorer for the Sweden national team, but she also had stints playing as a midfielder and a sweeper.

Sundhage was the head coach of the United States women's national team from 2008 to 2012 and led the team to two Olympic gold medals and a silver medal at the World Cup. Her success led to her winning the 2012 FIFA World Coach of the Year. Sundhage later became the head coach of her native Sweden women's national football team from 2012 to 2017, winning an Olympic silver medal in 2016.

Club career
Sundhage started with IFK Ulricehamn as a youth player and eventually moved to Falköpings KIK in 1978. She then joined Jitex BK from 1979 to 1981. Sundhage played 1982 to 1983 with Östers IF, scoring 30 times in her first season with the club and chipping in 35 more in her second season. 1984 saw a move back to Jitex BK, while 1985 saw Sundhage split time between Stattena IF, S.S. Lazio (where she scored 17 times), and Jitex BK. She played the 1986 season with Hammarby IF DFF, before she moved back to Jitex BK from 1979 through 1989. Sundhage finished her career with Hammarby IF DFF, playing from 1990 until she retired in 1996.

She won four Damallsvenskan championships, all with Jitex BK, as well as two additional Svenska Cupen with the club. She also won two Svenska Cupen with Hammarby IF DFF.

International career
Sundhage made her first appearance for the Sweden national team as a 15-year-old in 1975, eventually amassing 146 caps and scoring 71 goals for her country. Her 71 goals gave her joint-lead with Lena Videkull for the most in the Swedish national team history, a record which has since been surpassed by both Hanna Ljungberg and Lotta Schelin.

She participated for Sweden in the 1991 (a third-place finish) and 1995 editions of the FIFA Women's World Cup and the 1996 Summer Olympics. She won, and was the top scorer, in the 1984 UEFA Women's Championship. Her image appeared on a Swedish postage stamp in 1988. In 1989 Sundhage scored the first goal in a women's match at Wembley Stadium, as Sweden beat England 2–0 in a curtain–raiser for the Rous Cup.

In 2000, Sundhage finished sixth in the voting for FIFA Women's Player of the Century.

Coaching career

Pre-United States
Sundhage got her start in coaching as a player/manager when she was with Hammarby IF DFF from 1992 to 1994. She then took assistants jobs with Vallentuna BK (1998 to 1999) and AIK Fotboll Dam (2000) before moving across the Atlantic Ocean to become an assistant with Philadelphia Charge of the new Women's United Soccer Association in the United States. She eventually was hired on by Boston Breakers as the head coach, winning the league title and being named the 2003 WUSA Coach of the Year in the process. Once the WUSA folded however, it was back to Scandinavia to take on further coaching positions.

Her relationship with the Boston Breakers led United States Women's national team captain Kristine Lilly and fellow USWNT player Kate Markgraf joining her in the Swedish Damallsvenskan when Pia coached KIF Örebro DFF from 2005 to 2006, after a brief stint with Kolbotn IL in 2004. Lilly said she "wanted to play for Pia again."

Sundhage served as an assistant to Marika Domanski-Lyfors for the China Women's national team during the 2007 FIFA Women's World Cup.

United States women's national team
Pia Sundhage was announced as the United States women's national soccer team head coach on 13 November 2007. She became the seventh head coach in the U.S. team's history and the third woman. Lauren Gregg was in charge for 3 games in 2000, April Heinrichs led the squad from 2000–2004 and won the 2004 Summer Olympics, while Sundhage served as a scout for the United States during the 2004 Olympics.

While at the helm of the United States, Sundhage won the 2008 Algarve Cup and gold medals at both the 2008 Summer Olympics and the 2012 Summer Olympics. She was on the verge of winning the 2009 Algarve Cup, but the United States lost out to Sundhage's native Sweden on penalties. However, she did win the 2010 Algarve Cup a year later, defeating World and European Champions Germany 3–2 in the final.

She coached the women's team to the final of the 2011 FIFA Women's World Cup, where the team advanced to the final for the first time since 1999. However, they were upset by Japan, losing 3–1 on penalty kicks after a 2-2 draw. A year later, Sundhage coached the USWNT to another gold medal at the 2012 Summer Olympics in London, defeating Japan 2–1 in a Women's World Cup final rematch, with Carli Lloyd scoring both goals.

On 1 September 2012, Sundhage announced she was stepping down as the U.S women's head coach having expressed a desire to seek opportunities in her native Sweden. Sundhage announced she would coach the U.S. team's games on 16 and 19 September on the team's Olympic victory tour before officially resigning. "I have days where I think, 'What am I doing?' and there are other days where I'm like, 'I'm all up for this next challenge'" Sundhage said upon announcing her departing the US women's national team. She coached her last game against Australia as part the team's Olympic victory tour on 19 September, defeating them 6–2. With this final win Sundhage was able to leave the team with a 91–6–10 win–loss–tie record that included two Olympic gold medals and a second-place finish at the 2011 FIFA Women's World Cup.

Sweden women's national team
The Swedish Football Association announced early 2 September 2012 that Sundhage signed a four-year contract that starts on 1 December. The announcement came hours after Sundhage's match as coach of the U.S. women's team, an 8–0 win in a friendly match against Costa Rica; the first of a series organized to celebrate the winning of gold medal at the 2012 London Olympics. Sundhage replaced Thomas Dennerby, who resigned after Sweden failed to reach the semifinals in 2012 Olympics. "I have long dreamed of becoming Sweden coach and now I am so happy" Sundhage said. Sundhage's first major tournament as coach of the Sweden team was the 2013 European championship, which Sweden hosted; Sweden lost 0–1 in the semi-final to Germany, which won the championship.

After the UEFA Women's EURO 2017 tournament, in August 2017, Sundhage left the women's national team. In November 2017, the Swedish Football Association announced the appointment of Sundhage as the new Sweden women's national under-17 football team head coach. Sundhage took over her new duties on 1 January 2018.

Brazil women's national team
In July 2019, Sundhage accepted an invitation from the Brazilian Football Confederation (CBF) to become the new coach of the Brazil women's national football team.

Personal life
In January 2010, Sundhage mentioned in a Swedish TV interview that as a lesbian she has not felt any homophobia as a coach. "There has been no problem for me to be openly gay as head coach in the U.S.," said Sundhage.

Career statistics

Matches and goals scored at World Cup and Olympic tournaments

Matches and goals scored at European Championship tournaments

International goals

Managerial statistics
All competitive league games (league and domestic cup) and international matches (including friendlies) are included.

Honours

Player
Jitex BK
 Damallsvenskan: 1979, 1981, 1984, 1989
 Svenska Cupen: 1981, 1984

Hammarby IF DFF
 Svenska Cupen: 1994, 1995

Sweden
 FIFA Women's World Cup: third place 1991
 UEFA European Women's Championship: 1984; runner-up 1987, 1995; third place 1989
 European Competition for Women's Football: third place 1979 (non-official competition)
 Women's Nordic Football Championship: 1977, 1978, 1979, 1980, 1981; runner-up 1982
 Algarve Cup: 1995
 Cyprus Tournament: 1990, 1992
 North America Cup: 1987

Individual
 European Competition for Women's Football top scorer: 1984
 European Competition for Women's Football best player: 1984
 Damallsvenskan top scorer: 1982, 1983
 Women's Nordic Football Championship top scorer

Managerial
United States Women
 Olympic Gold Medal: 2008, 2012
 FIFA Women's World Cup: runner-up 2011
 Four Nations Tournament: 2008, 2011
 Algarve Cup: 2008, 2010, 2011

Sweden Women
 2016 Olympic Silver Medal

Brazil Women
 Copa América Femenina: 2022

Individual
 FIFA World Women's Coach of the year: 2012; finalist 2010, 2011, 2013 
 Best FIFA Women's Coach: finalist 2016
 2003 WUSA Coach of the Year

Awards 
Sundhage was awarded the Illis quorum in the eighth size by the Swedish government in 2021.

See also
 List of women's footballers with 100 or more international caps
 List of UEFA Women's Championship goalscorers
 List of UEFA Women's Championship records
 List of women's Olympic football tournament records and statistics
 List of LGBT sportspeople

References

Match reports

External links

US Soccer coach profile
Sweden coach profile

1960 births
Living people
1991 FIFA Women's World Cup players
1995 FIFA Women's World Cup players
Expatriate women's footballers in Italy
FIFA Century Club
Footballers at the 1996 Summer Olympics
Lesbian sportswomen
LGBT association football players
Swedish LGBT sportspeople
United States women's national soccer team managers
2011 FIFA Women's World Cup managers
2015 FIFA Women's World Cup managers
Olympic footballers of Sweden
Swedish socialists
Sweden women's international footballers
Swedish women's footballers
Hammarby Fotboll (women) players
Damallsvenskan players
Serie A (women's football) players
S.S. Lazio Women 2015 players
People from Ulricehamn Municipality
Women's association football forwards
Swedish women's football managers
Swedish expatriate football managers
Hammarby Fotboll (women) managers
UEFA Women's Championship-winning players
Sweden women's national football team managers
Brazil women's national football team managers
Female association football managers
Olympic gold medalists for Sweden
American Olympic coaches
Women's United Soccer Association coaches
Sportspeople from Västra Götaland County
Recipients of the Illis quorum